The Vyvyan Baronetcy of Trelowarren, Cornwall is a title in the Baronetage of England. It was created on 12 February 1645 for Richard Vyvyan, a member of Parliament for Penrhyn, Tregony and St Mawes and Master of the Mint. His eldest son, the second Baronet, represented St Mawes and Helston in the House of Commons. He was succeeded in 1697 by his son, the third Baronet, was a member of Parliament for Mitchell and Cornwall and a prominent Jacobite. The eighth Baronet sat as Conservative Member of Parliament for Cornwall, Okehampton, Bristol and Helston. His grandson, the tenth Baronet, was a Colonel in the British Army. As of 28 February 2014, the present Baronet has not successfully proven his succession and is therefore not on the Official Roll of the Baronetage, with the baronetcy considered dormant since 1995.

The Royal Warrant of 1911 suggests that if a Baronetcy is Dormant or Vacant the Title should not be acknowledged; however in this case it was acknowledged. The London Gazette no 58640 Friday14 March 2008: Duchy of Cornwall "The Prince of Wales has been pleased to direct Letters Patent to be passed under the Privy Seal of His Royal Highness appointing Sir Ralph Ferrers Alexander Vyvyan Bt of Trelowarren, Helston in the County of Cornwall, High Sheriff of Corwall." 
The family seat is Trelowarren, near Mawgan, Cornwall.

Vyvyan Baronets, of Trelowarren (1645)
Sir Richard Vyvyan, 1st Baronet (–1665)
Sir Vyell Vyvyan, 2nd Baronet (1639 – February 1696/97)
Sir Richard Vyvyan, 3rd Baronet (1681–1736)
Sir Francis Vyvyan, 4th Baronet (1698–1745) 
Sir Richard Vyvyan, 5th Baronet (1731 – October 1781)
Sir Carew Vyvyan, 6th Baronet (1737 – 4 October 1814)
Sir Vyell Vyvyan, 7th Baronet (1767–1820) 
Sir Richard Vyvyan, 8th Baronet (1800–1879)
The Rev. Sir Vyell Donnithorne Vyvyan, 9th Baronet (1826–1917), Rector of Withiel 
Sir Courtenay Bourchier Vyvyan, 10th Baronet (1858–1941)
Sir Richard Philip Vyvyan, 11th Baronet (1891–1978) 
Sir John Stanley Vyvyan, 12th Baronet (1916–1995)
Sir Ralph Ferrers Alexander Vyvyan, 13th Baronet (born 1960)

The heir apparent is the present holder's son Joshua Drummond Vyvyan (born 1986).

Clara Coltman Rogers Vyvyan, the wife of the 10th Baronet, wrote a number of books using the name C. C. Vyvyan; these include Our Cornwall; Amateur Gardening for Pleasure and Profit; Cornish Silhouettes; Echoes in Cornwall; Gwendra Cove; and Bird Symphony (an anthology).

See also

 Vyvyan family

References

Further reading
Kidd, Charles & Williamson, David (eds.). Debrett's Peerage and Baronetage (1990 edition). New York: St Martin's Press, 1990.

External links
 Trelowarren Estate

Baronetcies in the Baronetage of England
1645 establishments in England
Lizard Peninsula
Cornish Baronetage